Hemant Tukaram Godse (born 3 August 1970) is a member of the 17th Lok Sabha of India. He represents Nashik constituency of Maharashtra and is a member of the Shiv Sena. He was previously a member of the Maharashtra Navnirman Sena and contested the same constituency in the 2009 elections, but lost to the NCP's Sameer Bhujbal by 24,000 votes.

He defeated NCP strongman and former deputy chief minister of Maharashtra Chhagan Bhujbal who contested from Nationalist Congress Party by 1,87,336 votes by polling 4,94,735 votes against Bhujbal's 3,07,399. He again defeated Samir Bhujbal by 3 lakh votes in 2019 lok sabha election. he became 2nd MP to get repeated term after 56 years.

Positions held
 2007-2012: Member, Zila Parishad, Nashik
 2008-2009: Member, Senate of Pune University
 2012-2014: Elected as Councillor, Nashik Municipal Corporation
 2014: Elected to 16th Lok Sabha
 Sep. 2014 onwards : Member, Standing Committee on Information Technology
 May 2019: Elected to 17th Lok sabha

References

External links
 Shivsena website 
 Hemant Godse Lok Sabha Profile
 Hemant Godse Lok Sabha Biography

Living people
1970 births
People from Nashik district
Shiv Sena politicians
Lok Sabha members from Maharashtra
India MPs 2014–2019
Marathi politicians
Maharashtra Navnirman Sena politicians
Maharashtra district councillors
Nashik municipal councillors
India MPs 2019–present